Victor Rostagno (born ) is an Uruguayan male artistic gymnast. He represents his nation at international competitions, including the 2016 Pan American Individual Event Artistic Gymnastics Championships. Rostagno is notable for being the first male Uruguayan gymnast to earn a medal at the Pan American Gymnastics Championships. He is also the first Uruguayan gymnast to earn a gold medal at the South American Gymnastics Championships. Both achievements were accomplished in his first year as a senior gymnast, in 2016.

References

1998 births
Living people
Gymnasts at the 2019 Pan American Games
Uruguayan people of Italian descent
Uruguayan male artistic gymnasts
Place of birth missing (living people)
South American Games silver medalists for Uruguay
South American Games medalists in gymnastics
Competitors at the 2018 South American Games
Pan American Games competitors for Uruguay